Pinwright's Progress is a British television sitcom that aired on the BBC Television Service from 1946 to 1947 and was the world's first regular half-hour televised sitcom. The ten episodes, which aired fortnightly in alternation with Kaleidoscope, were broadcast live from the BBC studios at Alexandra Palace. Still photographs are all that remain of the show's transmitted form.

Pinwright's Progress was written by Rodney Hobson, produced and directed by John Glyn-Jones and the script editor was Ted Kavanagh, who also wrote the BBC radio comedy series It's That Man Again.

Cast
James Hayter as Mr J. Pinwright
Clarence Wright as Aubrey
Sara Gregory as Sally Doolittle
Daphne Maddox as Miss Peasbody
Doris Palmer as Mrs Sigsbee
Leonard Sharp as Ralph
Benita Lydal as Mrs Rackstraw
Charles Irwin as Salesman
Jill Christie as Pinwright's daughter

Outline
J. Pinwright is the proprietor of a small shop. He has a hated rival, and his staff only add to his problems by attempting to be helpful. Ralph, the messenger boy, is a deaf octogenarian.

Episodes
Episode 1 (29 November 1946)
J. Pinwright is the proprietor of the smallest multiple store in the world. He has a pretty daughter and a hated rival, and his difficulties are increased by his staff's efforts to be helpful.

Episode 2 (13 December 1946)
Christmas is coming and so, not to be beaten by his hated rival, the owner of Macgillygally's Stores, Mr. Pinwright prepares his Christmas Bazaar. There is trouble though, partly occasioned by the sudden appearance of three robed and bearded Father Christmases – one of whom is a fugitive from the law. Mrs. Sigsbee, however, lends tone to the proceedings by appearing in costume as the Fairy Queen and all ends well – or does it?

Episode 3 (27 December 1946)
Mr. Pinwright intends to lure post-Christmas shoppers by a handsome gift to the store's fiftieth customer – cigars or nylons, cash customers only considered. In addition he opens a brand new snack bar but some pills palmed off on him by that cunning salesman throw all his plans into confusion.

Episode 4: "Cash Crisis". (10 January 1947)

Episode 5: "Fashions and Pashuns". (24 January 1947)

Episode 6: "Strained Relations". (7 February 1947)

Episode 7: "The Gypsy’s Warning". (21 February 1947)

Episode 8: "Gone to Seed". (21 March 1947)

Episode 9: "Radio Activity". (2 May 1947)

Episode 10: "Staggered Holidays". (16 May 1947)

References
General
Vahimagi, Tise. British Television: An Illustrated Guide. Oxford University Press / British Film Institute, 1994. .
Mark Lewisohn, "Radio Times Guide to TV Comedy", BBC Worldwide Ltd, 2003
Specific

External links

1946 British television series debuts
1947 British television series endings
1940s British sitcoms
BBC television sitcoms
Lost BBC episodes